Břidličná (until 1950 Frýdlant nad Moravicí) is a town in Bruntál District in the Moravian-Silesian Region of the Czech Republic. It has about 3,000 inhabitants.

Administrative parts
Villages of Albrechtice u Rýmařova and Vajglov are administrative parts of Břidličná.

Geography
It is located in the Nízký Jeseník mountain range on the Moravice River.

History

The settlement of Skalka, which was a possible predecessor of Břidličná, was first mentioned in a document from 1320. Frýdlant nad Moravicí was first mentioned in 1490. In 1950 the name of the town was changed to Břidličná. The town statute was returned to Břidličná in 1973.

Sights
The landmark of the town is the parish Church of the Three Wise Men. It was built in 1577 and modified in 1610. It is a valuable building with preserved authentic Renaissance, Baroque and Neoclassical constructions.

References

External links

  

Cities and towns in the Czech Republic
Populated places in Bruntál District